The gastric glands are glands in the lining of the stomach that play an essential role in the process of digestion. All of the glands have mucus-secreting foveolar cells. Mucus lines the entire stomach, and protects the stomach lining from the effects of hydrochloric acid released from other cells in the glands. 

There are two types of gland in the stomach, the oxyntic gland, and the pyloric gland. The major type of gastric gland is the oxyntic gland that is present in 80 per cent of the stomach, and is often referred to simply as the gastric gland.  The oxyntic gland is an exocrine gland and contains the parietal cells that produce hydrochloric acid, and intrinsic factor. Intrinsic factor is necessary for the absorption of vitamin B12.

The other type of gland in the stomach is the pyloric gland found in the pyloric region taking up the remaining 20 per cent of the stomach area. The pyloric gland secretes gastrin from its G cells. Pyloric glands are similar in structure to the oxyntic glands but are endocrine glands with hardly any parietal cells.

Types of gland
The gastric glands are glands in the lining of the stomach that play an essential role in the process of digestion. All of the glands have mucus-secreting foveolar cells. Mucus lines the entire stomach 
of protects the stomach lining from the effects of hydrochloric acid released from other cells in the glands.

Gastric glands are mostly exocrine glands and are all located beneath the gastric pits within the gastric mucosa—the mucous membrane of the stomach. The gastric mucosa is pitted with innumerable gastric pits which each house 3-5 gastric glands. The cells of the exocrine glands are foveolar (mucus), chief cells, and parietal cells.
The other type of gastric gland is the pyloric gland which is an endocrine gland that secretes the hormone gastrin produced by its G cells.

The cardiac glands are found in the cardia of the stomach which is the part nearest to the heart, enclosing the opening where the esophagus joins to the stomach. Only cardiac glands are found here and they primarily secrete mucus. They are fewer in number than the other gastric glands and are more shallowly positioned in the mucosa. There are two kinds - either simple tubular with short ducts  or  compound racemose resembling the duodenal Brunner's glands.

The fundic glands (or oxyntic glands), are found in the fundus and body of the stomach. They are simple almost straight tubes, two or more of which open into a single duct. Oxyntic means acid-secreting and they secrete hydrochloric acid (HCl) and intrinsic factor.

The pyloric glands are located in the antrum of the pylorus. They secrete gastrin produced by their G cells.

Types of cell

There are millions of gastric pits in the gastric mucosa and their necessary narrowness determines the tubular form of the gastric gland. More than one tube allows for the accommodation of more than one cell type. The form of each gastric gland is similar; they are all described as having a neck region that is closest to the pit entrance, and basal regions on the lower parts of the tubes. The epithelium from the gastric mucosa travels into the pit and at the neck the epithelial cells change to short columnar granular cells. These cells almost fill the tube and the remaining lumen is continued as a very fine channel.

Cells found in the gastric glands include foveolar cells,  chief cells, parietal cells, G cells, enterochromaffin-like cells (ECLs), etc. The first cells of all of the glands are foveolar cells in the neck region–also called mucous neck cells that produce mucus. This is thought to be different from the mucus produced by the gastric mucosa.

Fundic glands found in the fundus and also in the body have another two cell types–gastric chief cells and parietal cells (oxyntic cells).

 Surface mucous cell (foveolar cell) – They are mucous producing cells which cover the inside of the stomach, protecting it from the corrosive nature of gastric acid. These cells line the gastric mucosa.
Mucous neck cell – Mucous neck cells are located within gastric glands, interspersed between parietal cells. These are shorter than their surface counterpart and contain lesser quantities of mucin granules in their apical surface.
 Chief cells (zymogen cells/peptic cells) – They are found in the basal regions of the gland and release proenzymes or zymogens – pepsinogen (precursor to pepsin), and prorennin (precursor to rennin or chymosin). Prorennin is secreted in young mammals (childhood stage). It is not secreted in adult mammals. Chief cells also produce small amounts of gastric lipase. Gastric lipase contributes little to digestion of fat.
 Parietal cells ("parietal" means "relating to a wall"), also known as oxyntic cells are most numerous on the side walls of the gastric glands. The parietal cells secrete hydrochloric acid, the main component of gastric acid. This needs to be readily available for the stomach in a plentiful supply, and so from their positions in the walls, their secretory networks of fine channels called canaliculi can project and ingress into all the regions of the gastric-pit lumen. Another important secretion of the parietal cells is castle's intrinsic factor. Intrinsic factor is a glycoprotein essential for the absorption of vitamin B12. The parietal cells also produce and release bicarbonate ions in response to histamine release from the nearby ECLs, and so serve a crucial role in the pH buffering system.
 Enteroendocrine cells or argentaffin cells – They are usually present in the basal parts of the gastric glands, which is differentiated into three cell types – enterochromaffin like cells (ECL cells), G-cells, and D-cells. 
 Enterochromaffin like cells (ECL cells) – They release serotonin and histamine. These cells store and release histamine when the pH of the stomach becomes too high. The release of histamine is stimulated by the secretion of gastrin from the G cells. Histamine promotes the production and release of HCL from the parietal cells to the blood and protons to the stomach lumen. When the stomach pH decreases (becomes more acidic), the ECLs stop releasing histamine.
 G cells – They secrete gastrin hormone. Gastrin stimulates the gastric glands to release gastric juice. These cells are mostly found in pyloric glands in the antrum of the pylorus; some are found in the duodenum and other tissues.  The gastric pits of these glands are much deeper than the others and here the gastrin is secreted into the bloodstream not the lumen.
 D-cells – D-cells secrete somatostatin. Somatostatin suppresses the release of hormones from the digestive tract.

Clinical significance
Fundic gland polyposis is a medical syndrome where the fundus and the body of the stomach develop many fundic gland polyps.

Pernicious anemia is caused when damaged parietal cells fail to produce the intrinsic factor necessary for the absorption of vitamin B12. This is the most common cause of vitamin B12 deficiency.

See also
 Zollinger-Ellison syndrome

Additional images

References

External links
  - "Fundic stomach"
  - "Mammal, ruminant stomach (LM, High)"
  - "Digestive System: Alimentary Canal - fundic stomach"
 Veterinary Histology at vt.edu
  - see slide #42
  - "Esophageal-stomach junction"
  - "Digestive System: Alimentary Canal: esophageal/stomach junction"

Digestive system
Stomach